Two Air France Douglas DC-4 aircraft crashed two days apart in June 1950 within a few miles of each other and under similar circumstances. These two accidents, on 12 and 14 June, occurred while the aircraft were operating the same route from Saigon to Paris. Both aircraft had stopped at Karachi Airport and crashed into the sea on approach to Bahrain. A total of 86 passengers and crew were killed: 46 on June 12th and 40 on June 14th. There were a total of 19 survivors: 6 on June 12th and 13 on June 14th.

Accident of 12 June 1950
Douglas DC-4 Ciel de Picardie (F-BBDE) was on a scheduled flight from Saigon to Paris and had departed at 16:05 from a stopover at Karachi for another stopover at Bahrain. At 21:15 the aircraft reported "finals" and the tower gave permission to land on Runway 29. The aircraft hit the water and crashed. Three survivors were found soon after the accident by a ship and three others were rescued by helicopter after eight hours in the water. All on board were French other than one stateless person. The French writer François-Jean Armorin  was on board. This crash was the deadliest since the Llandow air disaster, three months earlier, which killed 80.

Accident of 14 June 1950
Two days later, Douglas DC-4 Ciel de Gascogne (F-BBDM) was flying the same scheduled route from Saigon to Paris and as before had departed its Karachi stopover (this time at 16:43) for the stopover at Bahrain. At 21:41 it called Bahrain to report as being overhead. At 21:52 the aircraft reported "Procedure Turn" and the tower gave permission to land. The aircraft hit the water and crashed within  of the previous accident. After a search a ship reported picking up survivors at 02:00; 40 of the 53 occupants had been killed. Most of the passengers and the crew were French with two Vietnamese and two Chinese. At least 13 of the passengers were children.

The "New York Times" reported the incident as so:

"PARIS, Thursday, 15 June—A second four-engine Air France airliner with forty-five passengers aboard crashed into the Persian Gulf last night near Bahrein
Island, at approximately the same place where forty-six persons were lost two days before in another Air France crash. First reports said eleven persons
so far had been saved in the second crash. Both aircraft were en route from Saigon, Indo-China, to Paris. Last night's crash was the third French air disaster in three days, sixteen men being lost in a Madagascar flight."
("New York Times," 15 June 1950)

Aircraft
The aircraft were both Douglas DC-4 airliners powered by four Pratt & Whitney R-2000 Twin Wasp radial piston engines and able to carry up to 86 passengers.
 Aircraft F-BBDE, Ciel de Picardie was a Douglas DC-4-1009 that first flew on 3 June 1946 and had flown 8,128 hours by the time of the accident.
 Aircraft F-BBDM, Ciel de Gascogne was a Douglas DC-4-1009 that first flew on 27 June 1946 and had flown 8,705 hours by the time of the accident.

1950 investigation
A special commission of inquiry arrived on 15 June in Bahrain to investigate the first accident, it was then directed to investigate both accidents. The commission banned all French aircraft from landing at night while the cause was being investigated. The manager of Air France in the Far East said there were similarities between the two accidents, both having taken place at the same time of day in bad atmospheric conditions.

The probable cause determined by the inquiry for the 12 June 1950 accident was that the pilot-in-command did not keep an accurate check of his altitude and rate of descent during the timed approach procedure, thus allowing his aircraft to fly into the surface of the sea. The possibility that the pilot-in-command was feeling the effects of fatigue could not be ruled out. 

The investigation into both accidents recommended that consideration be given to equipping Bahrain Airport with radio landing aids and with suitable runway approach lights.

Following the discovery of the wreckage of F-BBDM on the seabed in 1994, a re-investigation of both accidents cast doubt on the findings of the 1950 investigation.

Wreckage discovery and re-investigation
In 1994 a hydrographic survey of the area to the east of Muhurraq Island off the end of the runway located a wing of an aircraft subsequently identified as that of DC-4 F-BBDM. A seabed inspection of the area located two of the Pratt & Whitney radial engines and three bent propellers together with assorted aircraft debris consisting of part of the tailplane, electric wiring, small passenger items and broken bottles. The Christian Cemetery Committee responsible for the maintenance of the Old Christian Cemetery in which the 86 casualties had originally been interred approved the idea of a permanent memorial. A joint venture between the Bahrain-based diving company TECHDIVE and Royal Navy divers recovered the least damaged propeller and after sandblasting and painting, it was mounted in the cemetery. In December the memorial was formerly dedicated by the French Ambassador, various church dignitaries and those involved in its recovery.

The 1994 discovery prompted a detailed unofficial re-investigation into the causes of the two crashes. This investigation ruled out pilot error, sabotage and mechanical failure. Ultimately, the cause was determined from contemporary weather condition reports from air traffic that were archived in the United Kingdom. Both crashes were attributed to extreme weather conditions on the approach to the airport on the two nights in question. These conditions are now referred to as microbursts. The results were published in a newspaper in Bahrain and had the support of Gulf Air's safety officer. The report was also relayed to France via its embassy in Bahrain, with the recommendation that the pilots be exonerated due to conditions unknown at the time and beyond their capability to counteract.

References
Notes

Bibliography

1950 in Bahrain
Aviation accidents and incidents in 1950
Aviation accidents and incidents in Bahrain
Accidents and incidents involving the Douglas DC-4
Air France accidents and incidents
Bahrain–France relations
June 1950 events in Asia